Maneater Series is the name, logo and line look given to a series of made-for-television natural horror films on DVD produced by RHI Entertainment for the Syfy Channel, and distributed by Vivendi Entertainment. The Maneater Series logo and line look were created under the direction of Danny Tubbs, the executive director of creative services of Vivendi Entertainment. The deal, made in October 2006, stipulated that the first ten films would premiere on the US-based channel in 2007, but due to a pre-licensing agreement, the first six actually premiered in Canada on the video on demand channel Movie Central on Demand. Most of the early films in the series were filmed in Winnipeg, Manitoba, Canada.

RHI has continued adding new films to the series, most of which are shown first on Syfy before being released to DVD. In 2013, the website was shut down due to technical difficulties.
The series was put on hold after 2011 because of RHI's financial problems but was then revived in 2013 with Scarecrow. Two more films were released in 2015.



Films in series

References

 
Film series introduced in 2007
Horror film series
American natural horror films
American monster movies